Jhonata Robert Alves da Silva (born 26 October 1999), commonly known as Jhonata Robert, is a Brazilian professional footballer who plays as a winger or an attacking midfielder for Campeonato Brasileiro Série A club Grêmio.

Club career

Grêmio
Born in Recife, Brazil, Jhonata Robert joined the Grêmio's Academy at the age of 17 in 2017 on loan from Barra-SC.

Career statistics

Club

Honours
Grêmio
Campeonato Gaúcho: 2021, 2022
Recopa Gaúcha: 2021, 2022

External links

References

1999 births
Living people
Brazilian footballers
Association football forwards
Grêmio Foot-Ball Porto Alegrense players
Cruzeiro Esporte Clube players
Campeonato Brasileiro Série A players
Primeira Liga players
F.C. Famalicão players
Brazilian expatriate footballers
Expatriate footballers in Portugal
Brazilian expatriate sportspeople in Portugal
Sportspeople from Recife